World Cinema: Diary of a Day is a 1995 collection of journals from filmmakers around the world. It includes entries from filmmakers as famous as Terry Gilliam to accomplished but little-known independents, such as Jurgen Vsych.

References 
 Aminia Brueggermann, "World Cinema: Diary of a Day," (review essay), The Journal of popular film and television, Vol. 25 No. 2 (1997): 91.

External links 
Amazon.com
Education Resources Information Center

Academic works about film theory
1995 books